The association football tournament at the 2018 South American Games was held from 27 May to 5 June in Cochabamba, Bolivia.

Men's teams were restricted to under-19 players (born on or after 1 January 1999), while women's teams were restricted to under-20 players (born on or after 1 January 1998).

Medal summary

Medal table

Men's tournament

Group stage
All times are local (UTC−04:00)

Pool A

Pool B

Knockout stage

Bracket

Semifinals

Third place match

Final

Women's tournament

All times are local (UTC−04:00).

References

Football
2018 in South American football
South
2018
2018